Tịnh Biên is an urban municipality (trấn thuộc huyện) and capital town of the Tịnh Biên District of An Giang Province, Vietnam.

Tịnh Biên was depicted in Robin Moore's fiction book The Green Berets; chapter 1 described a real-life battle during the Vietnam War in which all of the members of a United States Army Special Forces detachment were injured during the fighting.

References

External links
 Article on urban development in Tan Chau

Communes of An Giang province
Populated places in An Giang province
District capitals in Vietnam
Townships in Vietnam